Everything Last Winter is the debut album from the Anglo-Icelandic band Fields, first released April 2, 2007 by Atlantic Records. The album was produced by Michael Beinhorn. Tracks released as singles are "If You Fail We All Fail" and "Charming The Flames". The album is dedicated to Alan Spenner and features many thanks including to the bands Snow Patrol, Editors, and Bloc Party.  The track "Song For The Fields" was featured as a Single of the Week on iTunes.

Track listing

Credits

Fields
Nick Peill: acoustic guitar, vocals, keyboards
Thorunn Antonia: keyboards, vocals, synths
Henry Spenner: drums, vocals
Matty Derham: bass
Jamie Putnam: electric guitar

Additional Personnel
Michael Beinhorn: producer
Eliot James: vocal production, additional production, mixing

References

2007 albums
Albums produced by Michael Beinhorn
Fields (band) albums